Killing Time is the debut album by American experimental rock trio Massacre. It was released in September 1981, through record label Celluloid. It consists of a compilation of recordings made at Martin Bisi's OAO studio in Brooklyn, New York City in June 1981, and live recordings taken from their April 1981 Paris concerts. The group disbanded shortly after, eventually reforming 17 years later with Charles Hayward replacing Maher on drums. They recorded one more studio album and three live albums for John Zorn’s Tzadik Records. Killing Time was generally well received by critics of the time.

Critical reception 

AllMusic called it "one of the most obscure and most wonderful" albums to come out of the early 1980s downtown avant-garde scene. Pitchfork Media opined that it "belongs in a pretty select group of great, instrumental avant-rock albums". A BBC review describe Massacre as "an unholy union of The Shadows, Captain Beefheart, Derek Bailey and Funkadelic", and called Killing Time "genius".

Howard Mandel wrote in a review in DownBeat that on Killing Time Massacre show that they are as "aggressive" as their name, and "more purposeful" than their debut album's title. He said they manage their "tight trio stop-times as though their foreboding sound was as natural as bebop". Mandel concluded that Maher is "solid", Laswell "flexible and alert", and Frith "possessed by electric possibilities", and added that "[t]hey're convinced of what they're up to, and that certainty leaps from the grooves."

In a review of the 2005 CD re-issue of the album in the music journal Notes, Rick Anderson said that "[the] music remains as fresh and exciting today as it was 25 years ago, and is a vital document of a wonderful and all-too-brief period in New York's musical history".

FACT ranked it the 26th best album of the 1980s, calling it "a furiously addictive brand of semi-improvised, nitro-enhanced instrumental rock – a path Ruins and Battles would duly troop down decades later."

Re-issue 

Killing Time was re-issued on RecRec Music in 1993 with six extra tracks, and on Fred Records in 2005 with eight extra tracks, including a cover of "F.B.I." by The Shadows.  The Fred re-issue is a re-mastered copy of the 1982 Japanese release on Recommended Records Japan. It also corrected the original LP's tracks so as to be heard as originally intended, namely "at the correct speed and pitch and without added reverb" which had been altered by a "meddling engineer".

Track listing 
All tracks written by Massacre, except as noted.

1981 LP release

1993 CD re-issue

2005 CD re-issue

(*) denotes CD bonus tracks
"Conversations with White Arc" originally appeared on Fred Frith's solo album Speechless (1981)

Personnel 
 Massacre

 Fred Frith – Burns Black Bison guitar, Casio, radio, voice, WW II pilot's throat microphone
 Bill Laswell – 4- and 6-string bass guitars, pocket trumpet
 Fred Maher – drums, percussion

 Technical

 Martin Bisi – engineering (New York)
 Jean-Marc Foussat – engineering (Paris)
 Greg Curry – engineering (additional tape work)
 Tina Curran – original LP cover photography
 Thi-Linh Le – original LP cover photography and sleeve design
 Jan Luss – original sleeve design

References

External links 

1981 debut albums
Massacre (experimental band) albums
Celluloid Records albums
RecRec Music albums
Fred Records albums
Albums produced by Fred Frith